E3 ubiquitin-protein ligase UBR4 is an enzyme that in humans is encoded by the UBR4 gene.

References

Further reading